The Philippines participated in the 2010 Summer Youth Olympics in Singapore.

Basketball

Boys

Group D

9th-16th Classification

Swimming

Taekwondo

Tennis

Singles

Doubles

Weightlifting

Girls

References

External links
Competitors List: Philippines

2010 in Philippine sport
Nations at the 2010 Summer Youth Olympics
Summer Youth Olympics, 2010